Frank Aston Smith (21 March 1893 – 18 October 1975) was a New Zealand cricketer who played two matches of first-class cricket for Canterbury in the 1922–23 season. His son Brun played Test cricket for New Zealand.

Smith worked as a carpenter in Christchurch. In World War I he served overseas as a sapper with the New Zealand Engineers. He married Mary Catherine Brunton (1891–1971) in June 1921. He died in Christchurch in October 1975, aged 82.

References

External links

1893 births
1975 deaths
New Zealand cricketers
Canterbury cricketers
New Zealand Military Forces personnel of World War I
People from Kaiapoi
New Zealand Army soldiers
Cricketers from Canterbury, New Zealand
New Zealand military personnel